The following is a list of ecoregions in Somaliland as identified by the World Wide Fund for Nature (WWF).

Terrestrial
Somaliland is in the Afrotropical realm. Its two ecoregions are in the deserts and xeric shrublands biome.
 Ethiopian xeric grasslands and shrublands
 Somali montane xeric woodlands
 Somali Acacia–Commiphora bushlands and thickets

References

Somaliland
 
ecoregions